Tharaka-Nithi County is one of the 47 counties of Kenya. It was created from Kenya's erstwhile Eastern Province. The county has an area of 2609 km2 and as of the 2019 census a population of 393,177.

Tharaka-Nithi County is the home to the Chuka, Muthambi, Mwimbi and Tharaka subgroups of the Ameru community. The people of Tharaka-Nithi County are predominantly Christian, with Catholics, Presbyterians, and Methodists being the predominant religious communities.

The county consists of three constituencies: Maara, Chuka/Igambang'ombe, and Tharaka.

History
In 1992, Meru District was broken up into four new districts: Meru Central, Meru North, Meru South and Tharaka. Subsequently, Meru South, also known as Nithi, combined with Tharaka into the Tharaka-Nithi District. In 1998, the Tharaka-Nithi District was split into two districts, Nithi and Tharaka, but a 2009 High Court decision declared that split unconstitutional and re-combined the two. Subsequently, under the revised constitution of 2010, Tharaka-Nithi became a county.

Economy
Like other counties surrounding Mount Kenya, the primary economic activities in Tharaka-Nithi County are tea and coffee planting, subsistence dairy farming, and keeping livestock such as goats and sheep.

Prominent personalities
 Bernard Mate, politician; member of the Legislative Council and Parliament
 Muthomi Njuki, governor of Tharaka-Nithi County
Kithure Kindiki, politician; Senator and cabinet secretary 
Mzalendo Kibunjia, archaeologist and museum director
James Ngugi, entrepreneur and economist

See also
Isiolo County
Meru County
Embu County
Kitui County

References

External links
Office for the Coordination of Humanitarian Affairs – Kenya AdminLevels 1-4 (.pdf)
Muthomi Njuki Elected Governor – Tharaka Nithi County 2017

 
Counties of Kenya